Willibald Eser (1 September 1933 - August 2005) was a German screenwriter, notable for his work on films including A Glass of Water, Love from Paris, Temptation in the Summer Wind and The Dream of Lieschen Mueller.

Selected filmography
 Love from Paris (1957)
 The Count of Luxemburg (1957)
 A Glass of Water (1960)
 Ingeborg (1960)
 The Dream of Lieschen Mueller (1961)
 How I Learned to Love Women (1966)
 Slap in the Face (1970)
 Temptation in the Summer Wind (1972)

External links

German male screenwriters
1933 births
2005 deaths
20th-century German screenwriters